Wipeout (stylised as wipE′out″) is a futuristic racing video game developed and published by Psygnosis. It is the first game in the Wipeout series. It was originally released in 1995 for PlayStation and DOS, and in 1996 for Sega Saturn, being a launch title for the PlayStation in Europe. It was re-released as a downloadable game for the PlayStation 3 and PlayStation Portable via the PlayStation Network in 2007.

Set in 2052, players compete in the F3600 anti-gravity racing league, piloting one of a selection of craft in races on several tracks around the world. Unique at the time, Wipeout was noted for its futuristic setting, weapons designed to both stall and destroy enemy opponents and its marketing campaign designed by Keith Hopwood and The Designers Republic. The game features original music from CoLD SToRAGE, with tracks by Leftfield, The Chemical Brothers and Orbital appearing on some versions. The game was critically acclaimed on release; critics praised the game for its originality and its vast "unique techno soundtrack". However, it was criticised for its in-game physics. Wipeout spawned several sequels to critical acclaim.

Gameplay 

Wipeout is a racing game that is set in 2052, where players compete in the F3600 anti-gravity racing league. The game allows the player to pilot one of a selection of craft in races on several different tracks. There are four racing teams to choose from, and two ships for each team. Each ship has its distinct characteristics of acceleration, top speed, mass, and turning radius. By piloting their craft over power-up pads found on the tracks, the player can pick up various weapons and power-ups such as shields, turbo boosts, mines, shock waves, rockets, or missiles. The power-ups allow the player to either protect their craft or disrupt the competitors' craft.

There are seven race tracks in the game, six of them located in futuristic versions of countries such as Canada, the United States and Japan. After all tracks have been completed on the Rapier Championship, a hidden track (Firestar), set on Mars is unlocked. Wipeout features a multiplayer mode using the PlayStation Link Cable, allowing two player to race against each other and the six remaining AI competitors. The game also supports the NeGcon, a third-party controller designed by Namco.

Development and release 

Wipeout was developed and published by Liverpudlian developer Psygnosis (later known as Studio Liverpool), with production starting in the second half of 1994. According to Lee Carus, one of the artists, Wipeout took 14 months to develop, and the concept began as a conversation between Nick Burcombe and Jim Bowers at a pub in Oxton, Merseyside. Bowers then started on a concept film which was shown around Psygnosis' offices. It proved popular, and Wipeout was approved and production began. The marketing and artwork were designed by Keith Hopwood and The Designers Republic in Sheffield. Aimed at a fashionable, club-going, music-buying audience, Keith Hopwood and The Designers Republic created art for the packaging, in-game branding, and other promotional materials. A non-playable CGI film mock-up inspired by the game appeared in the teen cult film Hackers (1995), in which both protagonists play the game in a nightclub.

The team was under pressure, as it consisted of around ten people, and they were on a tight schedule. Carus stated that the code had to be rewritten three quarters of the way through development, and that the team was confident that they could complete the game on time. The vehicle designs were based on Matrix Marauders, a 3D grid-based strategy game whose concept was developed by Bowers and released for the Amiga in 1990. Burcombe, the game's future designer, was inspired to create a racing game using the same types of 'anti-gravity' vehicles from SoftImage's animation of two ships racing. The name "Wipeout" was given to the game during a pub conversation, and was inspired by the instrumental song "Wipe Out" by The Surfaris. Designing the tracks proved to be difficult due to the lack of draw distance possible on the system. Players received completely random weapons, resembling Super Mario Kart in their capability to stall rather than destroy opponents. Burcombe said that Wipeout was influenced by Super Mario Kart more than any other game.

Wipeout gained a significant amount of controversy on its initial release. A marketing campaign created and launched by Keith Hopwood and The Designers Republic included an infamous promotional poster, featuring a bloodstained television and radio presenter Sara Cox, which was accused by some of depicting a drug overdose. Next Generation printed the ad with the blood erased; the magazine staff explained that not only had they been under pressure from newsstand retailers about violent imagery in games magazines, but they themselves felt the blood added nothing to the ad other than shock value. The poster branded Wipeout "a dangerous game", with Wipeouts lead artist Neil Thompson suggesting—and designer Nick Burcome denying—that the "E" in Wipeout stood for ecstasy.

Wipeout was first released alongside the PlayStation in Europe in September 1995. It was the PlayStation's best-selling launch title in Europe. The game was released in the United States in November. The game went to number one in all the format charts, with over 1.5 million units of the franchise having been sold to date throughout Europe and North America. Wipeout was ported to the Sega Saturn in 1996. Because the company behind the PlayStation, Sony, owned the applicable rights to the last three tracks of the PlayStation version's soundtrack, new music was added for the Saturn version by Rob Lord and Mark Bandola. The Sega Saturn version was released by SoftBank in North America.

Music 
The game's electronica soundtrack was mostly composed by Welsh video game music composer Tim Wright under the alias CoLD SToRAGE. Additional music tracks were licensed from more established electronica acts to create the soundtracks for the PAL and Saturn versions of the game, as well as the promotional album, Wipeout: The Music. Additional music featured in the PAL version of the PlayStation game include tracks from Leftfield, The Chemical Brothers, and Orbital (also appearing on Wipeout: The Music), while the Saturn version includes three additional tracks by Rob Lord and Mark Bandola. Orbital's "Wipeout (P.E.T.R.O.L.)" was at least partially written before Burcombe met the musicians, and Leftfield's "Afro Ride" and The Chemical brothers' "Chemical Beats" are remixes of songs the artists had already recorded. The 1995 North American release, as well as the 1997 "Greatest Hits" reissue, only feature tracks by CoLD SToRAGE.

The promotional album Wipeout: The Music was released on CD and vinyl in 1996, and features the aforementioned three tracks by Leftfield, The Chemical Brothers and Orbital, as well as additional tracks by New Order and The Prodigy. Burcombe explained that the choice of genres was based on an experience he had while playing Super Mario Kart: he had just finished in first place but had "The Age of Love" playing instead of the game's soundtrack, and thought it fitted the moment. Persuading record companies to get involved with the promotional album proved difficult as they did not understand what the development team wanted. Notable, however, is the omission of tracks by CoLD SToRAGE. This surprised some, as Wright's contributions were popular with players, and the omission of his songs in favour of more established acts seemed to affront video game music as a burgeoning art form.

Reception 

Upon release, the game was critically acclaimed. IGN staff praised the game for its originality and unique techno soundtrack, but criticised the difficulty with manoeuvring the vehicles and also the difficulty of the game itself, stating that "there aren't nearly enough competitors" and that the player would have "[pulled] ahead of the other racers with no problem". Edge cited that it was hard to criticise "such a beautifully realised and well-produced game which [exploited] the PlayStation's power so well", but did show similar concerns over the game's longevity regarding its "reliance on track-based power-ups" that would "limit Wipeout's lifespan" in comparison to Super Mario Kart. GamePro gave the PlayStation version a rave review, predicting that "Wipeout's taut action and grueling courses will lure many diehard racing fans to this new system." They particularly praised the challenging gameplay and precise controls. They said the fact that multiplayer is only through the PlayStation Link Cable is the game's one major flaw, since the PlayStation still had a low installed base at this point and thus this would not be an option for most players. A reviewer for Next Generation applauded the stylish and detailed visuals, the "heart-pounding soundtrack", and particularly the exhilarating feel of the racing. He commented that the controls have a potentially frustrating learning curve but are worth mastering, and deemed the game "A new high-water mark". Maximum opined that of all the games in the PlayStation's European launch line-up, "not one title can match up to the awesome nature of Psygnosis' WipeOut. It's an amazing spectacle to behold, it sounds absolutely fantastic and it's the best playing racing game yet beheld on a next generation super console." Making particular note of the lack of pop-up, the coherent style and concept, the soundtrack, the unlockable Rapier mode, and the PAL optimisation, they gave it their "Maximum Game of the Month" award.

The later Saturn version also received generally positive reviews, though most critics agreed that it was not as good as the PlayStation version. In Sega Saturn Magazine, Rad Automatic praised the large number of tracks and the distinctive flavour of each one, and remarked that the gameplay is very easy to get into but provides more than enough challenge. He criticised it as not being as good as the PlayStation version, though he noted that none of the shortcomings impact the gameplay. The four reviewers from Electronic Gaming Monthly similarly praised the number and variety of tracks along with the strong challenge the game presented, and were much more approving of the graphics than Sega Saturn Magazine, describing them as "vibrant" and "gorgeous". A Next Generation critic said that while the graphics are slightly less sharp and the controls feel different, the Saturn version is essentially the same game as the PlayStation version. Both Air Hendrix of GamePro and a reviewer for Maximum argued that the Saturn version is noticeably not as polished as the PlayStation version but still excellent in absolute terms, making it a pointless purchase for PlayStation owners but recommended for Saturn-only players. In 1996, GamesMaster ranked the PlayStation version 41st on their "Top 100 Games of All Time."

Legacy 
The game's initial success led to Psygnosis developing several sequels which would later become part of the Wipeout franchise. A direct sequel, Wipeout 2097, was released for the PlayStation and Sega Saturn in 1996, which was met with positive reviews, especially aimed towards the vastly improved game engine and new physics the game offered. A Nintendo 64 spin-off, Wipeout 64, was released in 1998 and was met with considerable praise from critics, but was noted to be too similar to the original Wipeout. After the release of Wipeout in 1995, the awareness of the underground techno community in England was significantly boosted, with critics praising the vast "unique techno soundtrack" the game offered.

Wipeout has been described as being synonymous with Sony's debut gaming hardware and as an early showcase for 3D graphics in console gaming. It has since been re-released as a downloadable game for the PlayStation 3 and PlayStation Portable via the PlayStation Network in 2007.

The game's soundtrack, especially its use of tracks by popular contemporary artists, has been credited with prompting gaming developers to allot greater importance to the music in their games.

References

External links 
Video game
Wipeout at MobyGames
Soundtrack
European PlayStation edition at Discogs
North American PlayStation "Greatest Hits" reissue at Discogs
Sega Saturn edition at Discogs
Wipeout: The Music LP at Discogs
Listen to Wipeout music tracks by CoLD SToRAGE on Bandcamp

1995 video games
Advertising and marketing controversies
Android (operating system) games
DOS games
PlayStation (console) games
Sega Saturn games
Video games scored by Tim Wright (Welsh musician)
Video games developed in the United Kingdom
Video games set in the 2050s
Video games set in Canada
Video games set in Greenland
Video games set in Japan
Video games set in Russia
Video games set in the United States
Video games set on Mars
Windows games
Wipeout (series)
Multiplayer and single-player video games